Blue chaffinch may refer to one of two different bird species:
 Gran Canaria blue chaffinch, Fringilla polatzeki
 Tenerife blue chaffinch, Fringilla teydea